The Commission nationale de la certification professionnelle (CNCP, in English National Commission for Vocational Certification) is a French inter-ministerial commission, interprofessional and interagency. It has been created by the social modernization law (No. 2002-73). It is under the authority of the Minister responsible for vocational training.
It is composed of sixteen departmental officials, ten social partners, three elected representatives of chambers, three elected representatives of regions and twelve qualified persons. These commissioners are appointed by order of the Prime Minister for a period of five years renewable.
It replaces the Commission technique d’homologation des titres et diplômes de l’enseignement technologique (Technical Commission for approval of foreign education qualifications technological).

Mission 

The commission has several missions:
 Identify the supply of vocational qualifications (Répertoire national des certifications professionnelles),
 Process applications for registration and to update the répertoire national des certifications professionnelles (RNCP, in English National Repertory of Vocational Certifications),
 Ensure the renewal and adaptation of degrees and titles, to monitor the qualifications and work organization,
 Make recommendations to the attention of institutions delivering professional certifications or certificates of qualification.

The CNCP is based on the work of a specialized committee, a permanent secretariat and a network of regional correspondents. It contributes to the international work the transparency of qualifications.

See also
Commission des Titres d'Ingénieur
Conférence des Directeurs des Écoles Françaises d'Ingénieurs
Conférence des Grandes Écoles
Education in France

References

External links
 CNCP Official website

Education in France
2002 establishments in France
School accreditors